The Ricinidae are a family of a larger group Amblycera of the chewing lice. Most commonly they are ectoparasites of birds. The family includes the genus Ricinus.

References 

Lice
Insect families